the 2022 CAFA U-14 Championship was the first edition of the CAFA U-14 Championship, and the 7th of the CAFA Youth Championship,  the international youth football championship organized by CAFA for the men's under-14 national teams of Central Asia. Tajikistan hosted the tournament from 9–19 November 2022 in Hisor. Five nations will compete for the title in the seven-day round-robin event, with all teams to cross paths once before the final Matchday on 18 November, with players born on or after 1 January 2008 eligible to participate.

Tajikistan the host won their second youth title after finishing top of the table by collecting maximum points with astonishing statistics of zero losses and no goals conceived.

Participating nations
A total of 5 (out of 6) CAFA member national teams entered the tournament.

Did not enter

Venues
Matches were held at the Hisor Central Stadium.

Match officials
Referees

  Mohammad Ashraf Hussainzada
  Amir Saman Soltani
  Amirjon Khorkashev
  Resul Mammedov
  Abdurashid Khudoyberganov

Assistant referees

  Mohd Sharif Sarwari
  Mohammad Saleh Arababadi
  Khusravi Siddikzod
  Palvan Palvanov 
  Rustam Tagaev

Main tournament 
The main tournament schedule was announced on 5 November 2022.

Goalscorers

References

2022 in Asian football

2022 CAFA Under-14 Championship
2022 in Tajikistani football
2022 in youth association football